Harcourt may refer to:

People
Harcourt (surname)
Harcourt (given name)

Places

Canada 
Harcourt Parish, New Brunswick
Harcourt, New Brunswick, an unincorporated community
Harcourt, Ontario, a village
Harcourt, Newfoundland and Labrador, a former village

France 
Harcourt, Eure, a commune
Arboretum d'Harcourt, one of the oldest arboretums in the country

Hong Kong 
Harcourt Garden, Hong Kong, a small urban park
Harcourt House (Hong Kong), a commercial building
Harcourt Road, Hong Kong

South Georgia and the South Sandwich Islands 
Harcourt Island
Cape Harcourt

United Kingdom 
Harcourt, Cornwall, a coastal settlement
Harcourt Hill, a hill and community in Oxfordshire
Harcourt Arboretum, owned and run by the University of Oxford
Kibworth Harcourt, Leicestershire
Newton Harcourt, Leicestershire
Stanton Harcourt, Oxfordshire
Wigston Harcourt, a suburb of Wigston, Leicestershire

Elsewhere 
Harcourt, Victoria, Australia, a town
Harcourt, Iowa, United States, a small city
Harcourt Park, New Zealand, a camping ground
Mount Vernon Harcourt, Victoria Land, Antarctica, a stratovolcano
Harcourt Street, a street in Dublin, Ireland

In business 
Harcourt (publisher), a book publishing company or brand name
Studio Harcourt, a prestigious photographic studio in Paris, France

Other uses 
Viscount Harcourt, a title in the peerage of the United Kingdom
House of Harcourt, a British and French noble house
Collège d'Harcourt, in Paris, renamed the Lycée Saint-Louis in 1820
Harcourt House, Edmonton, an art gallery in Edmonton, Alberta, Canada
Harcourt House, London, Cavendish Square, London, a building
, a Union Navy tugboat in the American Civil War
, a Liberty ship

See also
Port Harcourt, Nigeria, a city
Harcourts, a New Zealand real estate company